Cho Kyoung-hee (born 26 August 1962) is a South Korean retired para table tennis player. She won a silver medal at the 2012 Summer Paralympics at age 50.

She began playing table tennis in 2005 at age 43, when a doctor advised her to exercise.

References 
 

1962 births 
Paralympic medalists in table tennis
South Korean female table tennis players 
Table tennis players at the 2012 Summer Paralympics 
Medalists at the 2012 Summer Paralympics 
Paralympic table tennis players of South Korea
Living people
Sportspeople from Gyeonggi Province
People from Bucheon
Paralympic silver medalists for South Korea
People with paraplegia